Jonathan Island is a privately owned island in Point Judith Pond in Narragansett, Rhode Island, United States. It is 2.79 acres-wide. As of 2012, it is the world's fourth most expensive island. It is owned by Ben and Diane Franford.

References

Islands of Rhode Island
Islands of Washington County, Rhode Island
Narragansett, Rhode Island
Private islands of the United States